Coryssomerus is a genus of beetles belonging to the family Curculionidae.

Species
 Coryssomerus capucinus (Beck, 1817)
 Coryssomerus robusticollis Pic, 1919
 Coryssomerus scolopax Faust, 1885

References

Curculionidae
Curculionidae genera